Calliope: Pittsburgh Folk Music Society is an organization that promotes folk music and folk dance in the Pittsburgh, Pennsylvania, area.  The Society started in the late 1960s, when performances were often held in George Balderose's house.  As time went on, the Society grew and eventually began renting out other performance venues for its shows.  Since 1976, Calliope has been a nonprofit educational and presenting organization that promotes and preserves traditional and contemporary folk music and its allied arts.  Today, Calliope sponsors various musical performances, a school of music, and now Rootz: The Green City Music Festival.

Calliope's yearly concert series features performances by many well-known musicians in various musical genres, and these performances are typically held in the Carnegie Lecture Hall, which is located in the back of the Carnegie Museum of Natural History complex in the Oakland neighborhood of Pittsburgh.  Past Calliope events have included performances by the following musicians:  Jean Ritchie, Odetta, Doc Watson, the Del McCoury Band, David Bromberg, Tom Rush, Richard Thompson, Mike Seeger, The New Lost City Ramblers, John McCutcheon, Robin and Linda Williams, Roger McGuinn, Sam Bush Band, The Roches, Gillian Welch, Guy Clark, Slaid Cleaves, Chris Smither, Tommy Emmanuel, Andy M. Stewart, David Holt, Lúnasa, Alvin Youngblood Hart, Saffire - The Uppity Blues Women, Ladysmith Black Mambazo, The Wailin' Jennys, Alejandro Escovedo, The Greencards, Rani Arbo and Daisy Mayhem, and many others.

References

External links
 Official Calliope Website

Music of Pittsburgh
Folk dance companies
Music education organizations
Folk music organizations